Polsbroek is a village in the Dutch province of Utrecht. It is a part of the municipality of Lopik, and lies about 10 km southeast of Gouda.

Overview 
The village of Polsbroek consists of a ribbon of farms on both sides of the Benschopse Wetering, with a small centre on the west side of the village. In 2001, the village centre of Polsbroek had 421 inhabitants.

(*): includes Cabauw, Vliet, Vlist, Zevender, Hoenkoop.

History
In the early 12th century Polsbroek itself was called first Pulzabruch, changing into Pulsebroch in 1155, to Pusbruch (from 1228 to 1229), Polsbroic, about 1296 and 1317, and than to Polsbroek. Since 1155 the (local) lords of Polsbroek are able to speak the high (blood court)  middle and low justice over their territory.

Until the end of the 18th century, Noord-Polsbroek was a lage heerlijkheid or schoutambt, the lowest category of local jurisdictions, while Zuid-Polsbroek was a vrije en hoge heerlijkheid (Free and high fief of Zuid-Polsbroek), during the Golden Age owned by the De Graeff family from Amsterdam. As a free a high fief, Zuid-Polsbroek was an independent (semisouverain fief) of the provinces Holland or Utrecht, like the larger Barony of IJsselstein to the east. Noord-Polsbroek was itself a part of that Barony.

In 1812, a single municipality "Polsbroek" was created, covering both Noord-Polsbroek and Zuid-Polsbroek, and several surrounding villages (Cabauw, Vliet, Vlist, Zevender, and Hoenkoop). Between 1814 and 1817, half of the municipality lay in the province Holland, while the other half was in Utrecht. In 1817, Polsbroek was divided into 7 separate municipalities again. Until 1857, Polsbroek was divided along the Benschopse Wetering into two parts: Noord-Polsbroek and Zuid-Polsbroek. On September 8, 1857 Noord-Polsbroek and Zuid-Polsbroek again merged to a single municipality. In 1989 the municipality Polsbroek became a part of Lopik.

See also
 Free and high fief of Zuid-Polsbroek (List of Lords of the Free and high fief)
 Noord-Polsbroek

References

Populated places in Utrecht (province)
Former municipalities of Utrecht (province)
Lopik